Chionodes petalumensis is a species of moth in the family Gelechiidae. It is found in North America from southern British Columbia to California, Arizona and Colorado.

Chionodes petalumensis caterpillars feed on oak leaves, including those of the Garry oak (Quercus garryana) and valley oak (Q. lobata).

The species was first described from Petaluma, California.

References

Chionodes
Moths of North America
Fauna of the California chaparral and woodlands
Moths described in 1947